The 2010–11 Antigua and Barbuda Premier Division (also known as the 2010–11 Digicel and Observer Group Premier Division for sponsoring purposes) is the 43rd season of the highest competitive football league of Antigua and Barbuda. It began on 19 September 2010 and will conclude on 14 February 2011. Bassa are the defending champions. All games are played at the Antigua Recreation Ground.

Teams
Willikies FC and Potters FC were relegated to the Antigua and Barbuda First Division after finishing in ninth and tenth place at the end of last season. They were replaced by the top two clubs from the First Division, Empire FC and Sea View Farm FC.

League table

Results

Promotion/relegation playoffs 
At the end of the year SAP FC will be in a three team round robin tournament with the 3rd and 4th place teams from the First Division. These two First Division teams will be Potters FC and Swetes FC, while Willikies FC and Bullets FC were promoted directly to the Premier Division.

Results: 

SAP (4 points, +9 goal difference) remains in the Premier Division. Potters (4 points, +1 goal difference) and Swetes (0 points, -10 goal difference) remain in the First Division.

References 

1
Antigua
Antigua and Barbuda Premier Division seasons